The Beasts of Tarzan is a novel by American writer Edgar Rice Burroughs, the third in his series of twenty-four books about the title character Tarzan. Originally serialized in All-Story Cavalier magazine in 1914, the novel was first published in book form by A. C. McClurg in 1916.

Plot summary
The story begins a year after the conclusion of the previous book, Tarzan (Lord Greystoke) and Jane have had a son, whom they have named Jack. Tarzan has spent much time building an estate home on the Waziri lands in Uziri, Africa, but has returned to his ancestral estate in London for the rainy season.

Tarzan's adversaries from the previous novel, Nikolas Rokoff and Alexis Paulvitch, escape prison and kidnap the Greystoke heir. Their trap is elaborate and insidious, leading both Tarzan and Jane to be kidnapped as well. Rokoff exiles Tarzan on a jungle island, informing him that Jack will be left with a cannibal tribe to be raised as one of their own, while Jane's fate is to be left to his imagination.

Using his jungle skill and primal intelligence, Tarzan wins the help of Sheeta, the vicious panther, a tribe of great apes led by the intelligent Akut, and a native warrior, Mugambi. With their aid, Tarzan reaches the mainland and begins a lengthy pursuit to find Jane (who is actively engineering her own extrication) and Jack.

By the end of the story Rokoff is dead, while Paulvitch, his cohort, is presumed dead but manages to escape into the jungle.  The Tarzan family returns to London along with Mugambi, who is offered a place at Tarzan's Waziri estate.

Comic adaptations
The book has been adapted into comic form by Gold Key Comics in Tarzan no. 157, dated January 1967, with a script by Gaylord DuBois and art by Russ Manning.

References

External links

 
ERBzine.com Illustrated Bibliography: The Beasts of Tarzan
Text of the novel at Project Gutenberg

1914 American novels
1914 fantasy novels
Tarzan novels by Edgar Rice Burroughs
American fantasy novels
American adventure novels
Novels first published in serial form
Works originally published in Argosy (magazine)
A. C. McClurg books
Novels about cats